Synaptopodin is a protein that in humans is encoded by the SYNPO gene.

Function 

Synaptopodin is an actin-associated protein that may play a role in actin-based cell shape and motility. The name synaptopodin derives from the protein's associations with postsynaptic densities and dendritic spines and with renal podocytes (Mundel et al., 1997).[supplied by OMIM]

Interactions 

SYNPO has been shown to interact with MAGI1.

References

Further reading